The first USS Montezuma was a merchant ship built in Virginia in 1795. The United States Navy acquired her during the Quasi-War with France and retained her name.

The Navy acquired Montezuma on 26 June 1798 from William Taylor at Baltimore, Maryland for service against French naval vessels and privateers attacking American merchantmen during the Quasi-War and placed her in service by the end of August 1798, with Capt. Alexander Murray in command.

Departing Baltimore on 3 November, Montezuma sailed as flagship of a squadron consisting of brig , cutter , and schooner  for the West Indies. The squadron was to cruise off Guadeloupe and Martinique to protect American merchantmen and search for French men-of-war. The ships encountered two enemy vessels on 20 November and gave chase, capturing without a fight the brig Fair American, an American vessel taken by French privateers only five days previously, but losing Retaliation to two French frigates that appeared on the horizon. After a long chase the squadron was able to evade the French warships and then put into St. Thomas. Montezuma continued on her duty in the West Indies, convoying merchant ships to various Caribbean ports into 1799 and then on 7 March fell in with and captured French brig Les Amis, 16 guns, off Curaçao. Montezuma was ordered home in mid-March and arrived Philadelphia on 12 May 1799 after convoying 57 merchant ships to various ports on the eastern seaboard.

Montezuma sailed on her second voyage to the West Indies on 28 May under the command of Lt. John Mullowny. This time she was bound for St. Kitts in the Leeward Islands, escorting U.S. shipping and then sailing to Jamaica to take on prize money, carrying it to Philadelphia, arriving Fort Mifflin on 31 July. Montezuma departed Fort Mifflin on 4 August on her last voyage in the Navy. She sailed to St. Kitts to pick up French prisoners for immediate return to Baltimore. Arriving on 28 August, Montezuma, because of cramped, unfavorable conditions, loaded only 50 prisoners and departed on 30 August to return to Baltimore, arriving on 14 September.

There the ship remained while all her armament and stores were removed in preparation to being sold because of her poor seakeeping ability as a warship. Following much deliberation, Montezuma was finally sold to her original owner, William Taylor of Baltimore, on 30 December 1799. Re-equipped for merchant service, she sailed the Atlantic on a Baltimore-Liverpool run until disposed of some years before the beginning of the War of 1812.

See also

References
 

Quasi-War ships of the United States